The history of Canada-Palestine ties is complicated. Various circumstances, including Canada's colonial legacy, foreign relations, and the ongoing Israeli-Palestinian conflict, have shaped it.

During the Ottoman Empire's rule over Palestine, which lasted until World War I, Canada did not have a significant relationship with the region. However, following the war, the British Empire gained control over Palestine, and Canada became a member of the League of Nations, which granted Britain the mandate to administer Palestine. In 1947, the United Nations General Assembly voted in favor of the partition of Palestine, leading to the creation of the state of Israel in 1948. Canada endorsed the partition plan.

However, Canada's relationship with Palestine has been more complicated. After the 1967 Arab-Israeli War, Israel occupied the West Bank and Gaza Strip, territories that were recognized by the international community as part of Palestine. Canada initially supported a two-state solution to the Israeli-Palestinian conflict, but over time, its policies shifted towards a more pro-Israel stance.

In recent years, Canada has continued to maintain diplomatic relations with Israel and has been criticized by some for not taking a more active role in supporting Palestinian rights. However, Canada has also provided humanitarian aid to Palestinians and has expressed support for a two-state solution.

The Canadian government recognizes the Palestinian Authority (PA) as the representative of the Palestinian people and has maintained contact with the PA since its establishment in 1994. Canada has also provided financial assistance to the PA in support of institution-building, economic development, and humanitarian assistance.

Diaspora
There are about 30,000 Palestinians living in Canada.

History 
From 1948 to 1967, Canada recognized Israel shortly after its establishment, but did not formally recognize the Palestinian refugees as a distinct group or advocate for their rights. However, Canada did support the United Nations Relief and Works Agency (UNRWA), which provided assistance to Palestinian refugees.

In the aftermath of the 1967 Arab-Israeli War, Canada began to express concern about the situation of the Palestinians and the need for a peaceful resolution to the conflict. In 1969, Canada supported the UN Security Council Resolution 242, which called for Israeli withdrawal from the territories occupied in the war and the recognition of the right of all states in the region to live in peace within secure and recognized boundaries.

During the 1970s through the 1980s, saw Canada become more actively engaged in efforts to promote a peaceful resolution to the conflict.

Official Palestinian-Canadian ties can be traced back to the aftermath of the Oslo Accords; in 1993, a Canadian representative office was established in Ramallah. On the other side, in 1995, an office in Ottawa was established to represent Palestinian interests.

See also
Foreign relations of Canada
Foreign relations of Palestine

References 

 
Palestine
Bilateral relations of the State of Palestine